Imtiaz Ahmed may refer to:

 Imtiaz Ahmed (brigadier), Pakistani general
 Imtiaz Ahmed (cricketer) (1928–2016), Pakistani Test cricketer
 Imtiyaz Ahmed, Indian cricketer who plays for Uttar Pradesh
 Syed Imtiaz Ahmed (1954-2020), Indian cricketer